The Columbia Valley is the name used for a region in the Rocky Mountain Trench near the headwaters of the Columbia River between the town of Golden and the Canal Flats. The main hub of the valley is the town of Invermere. Other towns include Radium Hot Springs, Windermere and Fairmont Hot Springs. The Panorama Ski Resort is located near the valley.

The Columbia Valley is home to the Columbia Wetlands, a vital link on a major bird migration route.

External links
 Columbia Headwaters Legacy Program
 Columbia Valley, BC—Business Directory, Local Online Newspaper, Live Webcams

 
Valleys of British Columbia